Data merge may refer to:
Mail merge
Data integration
Merge algorithm

See also
Merge (disambiguation)